Chihaya (襅; ちはや) refers to certain articles of clothing worn in Japanese culture.

These may include:

 A cloth or cord used to tie back the sleeves of a robe, primarily used by women to get the sleeves out of the way for work ranging from important shrine ceremonies, to just humble kitchen work.  
 A kind of ceremonial overcoat with a long white hem worn by the sweeper or branch-holder in certain Shintō ceremonies.  
 A kind of sleeveless vest or waistcoat used in kabuki or 人形浄瑠璃 (ningyō jōruri; "puppet theater").

One source describes the chihaya as "a traditional formal upper-garment with very large sleeves, a long strip falling along the back and tying-strings over the chest", and states that this garment was "used by nobles in the Heian court, where it was called 'a hunting garment' (kariginu)".

References

Shinto religious clothing
Japanese sashes
Japanese upper-body garments